Edi Kusdaryanto (born 9 May 1975) is an Indonesian former professional tennis player. He represented Indonesia in the Davis Cup and made an ATP Tour main draw appearance in the doubles of the 1996 Indonesia Open.

Kusdaryanto featured in the doubles rubber in four Davis Cup ties and was unbeaten. On his Davis Cup debut in 1996 he partnered with Suwandi, to a win over South Korea's Chang Eui-jong and Lee Hyung-taik. For his three other rubbers, across 1999 and 2000, he teamed up with Hendri Susilo Pramono.

Later in his career he took up the sport of soft tennis and had success in regional competitions. He won three gold medals in soft tennis at the 2011 Southeast Asian Games and was the singles silver medalist at the 2014 Asian Games.

See also
List of Indonesia Davis Cup team representatives

References

External links
 
 
 

1975 births
Living people
Indonesian male tennis players
Asian Games medalists in soft tennis
Asian Games silver medalists for Indonesia
Soft tennis players at the 2014 Asian Games
Medalists at the 2014 Asian Games
Southeast Asian Games medalists in tennis
Southeast Asian Games medalists in soft tennis
Southeast Asian Games gold medalists for Indonesia
Southeast Asian Games bronze medalists for Indonesia
Sportspeople from East Java
People from Bondowoso Regency
Competitors at the 1995 Southeast Asian Games
Competitors at the 2011 Southeast Asian Games
20th-century Indonesian people
21st-century Indonesian people